Cadernos Pagu is a Brazilian academic journal on gender studies and sexuality. It was established in 1993 at the Universidade Estadual de Campinas. Pagu was the nickname of Patrícia Galvão, an iconic Brazilian feminist. The journal is published in Portuguese and the editor-in-chief is Leila Mezan Algranti (Universidade Estadual de Campinas).

Abstracting and indexing 
The journal is abstracted and indexed in:
 Sociological Abstracts
 MLA International Bibliography
 International Bibliography of Periodical Literature
 International Bibliography of Book Reviews of Scholarly Literature

External links 
 Online access at SciELO
 

Gender studies journals
Sexology journals
Publications established in 1993
Portuguese-language journals